St Pancras Coroner's Court is the Coroner's Court for inner north London. It is located at Camley Street, St Pancras, London. The court covers cases for the London boroughs of Camden, Islington, Hackney and Tower Hamlets.

References

London Borough of Camden
Coroner's courts in London